Dejan Manjak (1333) was a nobleman in the service of Serbian King Stefan Dušan, only mentioned in a charter dated January 22, 1333, in which Stefan Dušan officially sold Ston and Prevlaka to the Republic of Venice. Based on the order in which the witnesses appear, vojvoda Dejan was of lower rank than stavilac Miloš.

K. J. Jireček suggested that Dejan Manjak was the same person as Dejan, the sevastokrator of Dušan.

According to two fresco compositions dated between 1332 and 1337 in the Kučevište Monastery, in the narthex, on the northern and southern wall, Dejan had a wife, Vladislava, and two sons, Jovan and Dmitar. Dejan is depicted on the southern wall with his wife standing next to Stefan Dušan and his wife Jelena.

Annotations
His surname may also be rendered Manak (Манак) or Manijakis (Манијакис). It is unknown whether Manjak was a demonym or an actual surname.

References

Sources

Further reading

14th-century Serbian nobility
Generals of Stefan Dušan
People of the Kingdom of Serbia (medieval)
Year of birth unknown
Year of death unknown
Boyars of Stefan Dušan